1975–76 Oberliga may refer to:

 1975–76 Oberliga, a West German association football season
 1975–76 DDR-Oberliga, an East German association football season
 1975–76 DDR-Oberliga (ice hockey) season, an East German ice hockey season